The George Medal is awarded by the United Kingdom and Commonwealth of Nations for acts of great bravery; over 2,000 medals have been awarded since its inception in September 1940. Below are set out lists of recipients of the award. A person's presence in these lists does not suggest their award was more notable than any other award of the George Medal.

 List of recipients of the George Medal, 1940s
 List of recipients of the George Medal, 1950s
 List of recipients of the George Medal, 1960s–1980s
 List of recipients of the George Medal, 1990s–2010s

External links
 List of all WW2 Non Combat Gallantry awards